Balaibunia Union is an Union Parishad under Morrelganj Upazila of Bagerhat District in the division of Khulna, Bangladesh. It has an area of 9.42 km2 (7.50 sq mi) and a population of 17,599.

References

Unions of Morrelganj Upazila
Unions of Bagerhat District
Unions of Khulna Division